Birtha, was an ancient town to the southeast of Thapsacus, which Ptolemy (v. 19) places in 73° 40′ long., 35° 0′ lat.  This place, the same as the Birtha of Hierocles, has been confounded by geographers with the town in Osrhoene, which lies much further to the north.

References

Attribution

Former populated places in Iraq